Deliveroo is a British online food delivery company founded by Will Shu and Greg Orlowski in 2013 in London, England. It operates in the United Kingdom, France, Belgium, Ireland, Italy, Singapore, Hong Kong, the United Arab Emirates, Kuwait and Qatar. It formerly operated in Germany, Taiwan, Spain, the Netherlands, and Australia.

Its subsidiary operation, Deliveroo Editions operates ghost kitchens—kitchens not on restaurant sites—for the preparation of delivery-only meals.

Deliveroo HOP operates from delivery-only grocery stores run by Deliveroo, working in partnership with existing grocers. Deliveroo also provides delivery and technology for on-demand grocery to major UK retailers. 

The company was first listed on the London Stock Exchange on 31 March 2021 as Deliveroo Holdings plc. It is seen by some as being among the worst IPOs in the history of the London exchange. In 2022, in its first annual report since listing, Deliveroo showed growth in Gross Transaction Value of 70% year-on-year in constant currency.

Business

History and basic operations
Deliveroo, headquartered in London, was founded in 2013 by Will Shu and Greg Orlowski. The company makes revenue by charging restaurants a commission fee, as well as by charging customers a per-order fee for delivery. It operates in two hundred cities in the UK, France, Belgium, Ireland, Italy, Singapore, United Arab Emirates and Hong Kong. In 2022, Deliveroo launched an advertising platform enabling businesses to promote products across its app.

Customers place orders through its app or website, then self-employed bicycle or motorcycle couriers transport orders from restaurants to them.

In November 2017, Deliveroo introduced Deliveroo Plus, a subscription service which gives customers in the UK unlimited free delivery.

Deliveroo works with some of the biggest chain restaurants across the UK, along with thousands of independent restaurants. On 16 November 2016, it became known that the brewing company Heineken International had closed a deal for Deliveroo to deliver the latter's beers and ciders, initially across 15 sites in London, Bath and Cardiff. This delivery deal, whose activities started that same week, was considered the biggest one of its kind (that is, with regards to the brewing industry).

In January 2017, Deliveroo announced plans to create 300 tech jobs in the UK when it opened its new head office in London later in 2017. That month the company had more than 1,000 full-time employees. As of 2022, Deliveroo employs over 3,000 staff globally

In April 2017, Deliveroo's Editions kitchens launched. These delivery-only kitchens allow restaurants to access customers in locations without needing High Street premises, thereby reducing set-up costs compared to a full-service restaurant. Deliveroo uses its data to identify areas where customer demand for certain cuisines is high and predicts which restaurants are likely to succeed there.

In mid-June 2016, the founders of Deliveroo, Will Shu and Greg Orlowski received an award for the Best Startup Founders as part of The Europas Startup Conference and Awards, mainly given to technology companies. The company also received Fastest Rising Startup of the Year and the Europas Grand Prix award.

In September 2021, it was announced that Deliveroo was taking its first step into rapid grocery deliveries by opening its own “dark store” in London in partnership with supermarket chain Wm Morrisons. The new service "Deliveroo HOP" was designed to serve residents within 10 to 15 minutes. Since 2021, Deliveroo has struck partnerships with major grocery partners including Morrisons, Waitrose, Co-op, Sainbury’s, SPA, Asda and Wholefoods in the UK; and in international markets with Esselunga in Italy, Auchan in France and ParknShop in Hong Kong. In the second half of 2021, grocery accounted for 8% of the company's Gross Travsaction Value.

Economic impacts in the UK
In December 2017, a study by macroeconomic consultancy Capital Economics stated that Deliveroo had helped create 7,200 jobs across the restaurant sector since it launched in 2013. It also boosted the industry's revenue by £460 million in the year to June 2017. The report also found that Deliveroo had helped add £372 million in value to the UK economy in the same 12-month period, a figure which Capital Economics projected to rise to £1.5 billion in the year to June 2019.

Competition
Deliveroo's main competitors are Just Eat and Uber Eats.  In 2021, Deliveroo expanded it UK population coverage to 77% compared to 53% at the end of 2020. However, its market share remains behind that of Just Eat. 

Deliveroo has made public its goal to build a leading market positions (#1 or strong #2) in every market in which it operates. In 2022, it announced it was proposing to consult on ending its operations in the Netherlands, citing that "it would require a disproportionate level of investment, with uncertain returns, to reach and sustain a top-tier market position."

Number of employees
According to its 2021 annual report, Deliveroo employs 3,108 staff worldwide. It also works with 180,000 self-employed riders.

Layoffs or redundancies
In April 2020, Deliveroo made 15% of the workforce redundant, citing Covid-19 as the reason, even though the number of orders was at an all-time high.

In Feb 2023, Deliveroo made 9% of the workforce redundant, as it continued to outsource jobs to the India HQ in Hyderabad.

Technical malfunctions 
On 7 September 2016, the Deliveroo website and application crashed in the British city of Chelmsford, reportedly due to a high demand on the first night of launching its service there.

On Tuesday 1 November 2016, at around 8 pm (GMT), technical problems caused the Deliveroo system in the UK to go offline for around an hour. Reportedly, thousands of customers who had already paid for their orders got upset due to a lack of clear communication being provided by the company during the incident, with some customers having to wait hours to get their food delivered.

During any periods when the system is down, and therefore no deliveries are available for riders, Deliveroo pays riders a flat rate per hour until the system is restored.

Funding 
In June 2014, Deliveroo raised a £2.75 million series A investment round from Index Ventures and Hoxton Ventures, as well as an assortment of angel investors. In January 2015, Roofoods Ltd, doing business as Deliveroo, received US$25 million in series B funding led by Accel with participation from Index Ventures, Hummingbird Ventures and Hoxton Ventures at an estimated valuation of $100 million. At this time, Deliveroo was providing deliveries for approximately 750 restaurants. In July of that year, it secured a further $70 million in series C investment from Index Ventures and Greenoaks Capital, marking Deliveroo's third funding round in a year.

In November 2015, Deliveroo raised $100 million in Series D Funding. In August 2016, Deliveroo raised a Series E of $275 million from the hedge fund Bridgepoint.

In September 2017, the company announced a $385 million Series F round. In November of the same year, an additional $98 million was announced, bringing the total Series F round to $480 million.

In May 2019, the company announced a $575 million Series G round led by Amazon, bringing the total raised to date to $1.35 billion.

In January 2021, the company announced a $180 million Series H round raised from existing investors, bringing the total raised to date to $1.53 billion.

IPO 
In March 2021, the company announced its intention to join the London Stock Exchange with an IPO.

It was listed on 31 March, but lost 31 percent of its value on the first day. One of the company's bankers reportedly described it as "the worst IPO in London's history". By August 2021, Deliveroo's share price had recovered to its IPO offering levels.

Taylor Review 
In October 2016, British Prime Minister Theresa May announced a review into employment practices in the modern economy, chaired by Chief Executive of the RSA Matthew Taylor. The review was criticised, accusing the probe of being biased as it was revealed by the Financial Times that one of its members was an early backer of Deliveroo, a fact that was not disclosed to the public. In its submission to the review, Deliveroo called on the Government to update legislation to allow the company to offer its riders rights – such as injury pay and sick pay – without limiting the flexibility which comes with self-employment. The company was the first in the on-demand economy to ask for changes in legislation to enable it to offer self-employed riders more benefits.

Deliveroo argued that current employment legislation meant that companies in the on-demand economy were forced to choose between offering riders flexible work or benefits. Deliveroo suggested that the Government either allow companies to offer entitlements to self-employed people, or create a new category of employment in which benefits are calculated on the services they deliver instead of how many hours they work.

Rider safety 
In response to the attacks on moped drivers over the summer of 2017, Deliveroo announced a series of measures to help keep riders safe. Among the measures introduced was a new app feature that allows riders to raise security concerns, plus a trial of helmet cameras to allow Deliveroo to gather evidence and to pass on information to the police. The company also hired 50 new staff across the country who have a focus on rider safety.

In December 2017, Deliveroo announced that its riders would have access to the first insurance scheme for food delivery riders in the UK on-demand economy. As well as sickness and accident insurance cover, cyclists will also have access to the first-of-its-kind public liability insurance.

Market departures

Germany
On 12 August 2019, Deliveroo sent an email to German customers stating its decision to leave the German market and indicating that all services would stop from 16 August. The email cited its inability to provide a sufficient quality of service, and that it would focus on other markets. The announcement came days after acquiring Scottish startup Cultivate, and three months after raising £450 million in a funding round led by Amazon.

Taiwan
Deliveroo entered the Taiwan market in October 2018. In Taiwan, Deliveroo relied on contractors, according to an investigation by the Ministry of Labor. As Deliveroo workers in Taiwan were not considered employees, it was unclear if the company was required to provide labor insurance to workers. Despite not having the status of employees, Deliveroo and several courier services in Taiwan were cautioned by the labor ministry in 2019 that the  applied to contractors. Therefore, Deliveroo agreed to suspend work for riders when the government suspends work for those with employee status due to natural disasters.

In October 2019, Sharing Economy Association Taiwan proposed safety regulations that were agreed to by several courier services active in Taiwan, including Deliveroo. That same month, Taiwan's Directorate General of Highways (DGH) fined Deliveroo for violations of the Highway Act, as it had not applied for a business license to establish an automobile transportation enterprise. Additionally, the DGH ordered Deliveroo to cease operations. Deliveroo announced its exit from Taiwan in April 2020.

Spain
In August 2021, Deliveroo announced it would be pulling out of Spain. This followed the Spanish government’s decision in March to introduce a law giving gig economy workers employee rights, rather than those of a self-employed contractor. Deliveroo said the law was not the determining factor in its withdrawal from Spain, but had hastened it.

Netherlands
In October 2022, Deliveroo announced it would be exiting the Netherlands.

Australia
In November 2022, Deliveroo announced it would be exiting Australia after entering voluntary administration. The decision came after the company faced financial loss from strong competition, and criticism from some government ministers. The shutdown was with immediate effect, giving riders and restaurants no notice, resulting in immediate unemployment and lost revenue.

Praise 
In a 2016 study of the sharing economy, PwC described Deliveroo as "one of the sharing economy's quickest-growing stars".

TechCrunch awarded Deliveroo 'Best Startup Founders' in the Europas Awards 2016, and praised founders Will Shu and Greg Orlowski.

In November 2016, Management Today said that Deliveroo had become 'one of the best' in the food delivery sector due to providing a network of dedicated couriers and an ordering platform which enabled restaurants to offer delivery

Deliveroo was the overall winner of the 2017 UK Deloitte Technology Fast 500 awards. David Cobb, lead partner for the awards programme, described Deliveroo as the fastest-growing technology company in the history of the competition, with a record four-year revenue growth of 107,117% making them a UK "unicorn".

Criticisms

Rider working conditions 
In March 2016, Australian-based employment lawyer Josh Bornstein, principal at Maurice Blackburn, examined work contracts from Deliveroo and its competitor Foodora and described the contracts as "sham", designed to pay workers "below the award rates" and to "deny their basic benefits". Maurice Blackburn announced that test cases against Deliveroo, as well as against Foodora, were being prepared wherein they were "accused of under-paying their delivery riders and failing to meet minimum employment conditions". Such allegations were confirmed by the Young Workers Centre in Australia, which claimed that the contracting arrangements by those companies left workers without access to minimum pay rates, WorkCover insurance, leave and superannuation. The centre's "Rights for Riders" campaign aims "to improve safety, pay, conditions and job security for food delivery riders".

In August 2016, a group of Deliveroo's London drivers held a day-long strike to protest about a new pay plan which they claimed would result in riders earning substantially below the minimum wage, and the continuing lack of sick and accident pay. The company later abandoned these plans.

During these strikes, as a means of protest, London Deliveroo drivers held up signs containing the neologism "Slaveroo". The term and its corresponding social media hashtag were adopted by several news outlets, including non-English international media. In the aftermath of these protests, Mags Dewhurst, chair of the Independent Workers Union of Great Britain (IWGB) Couriers and Logistics Branch, which represents some couriers and delivery drivers in London, published an article in The Guardian backing the protesters, saying that Deliveroo's claims of offering freedom and flexibility, vis-à-vis its couriers, were a sham, calling them "bywords for exploitation and exhaustion".

On 8 November 2016, news headlines covered the demand by a small group of UK Deliveroo drivers for union recognition by the company. The IWGB represented the drivers in the Camden area of north London. In November 2017, the Central Arbitration Committee dismissed the challenge by the IWGB and ruled that Deliveroo riders are self-employed. Deliveroo welcomed the decision as a 'victory for riders [who] value the flexibility that self-employment provides'.

In 2017 and 2018, Dutch online consumer affairs journalist Tim Hofman investigated Deliveroo undercover, asserting that the company forced its delivery staff to declare themselves self-employed rather than being employees of the company, which would give them rights to benefits such as sick pay. The investigation and presentation of the evidence to Deliveroo management was released as episodes of the #BOOS online programme.

In May 2017, Deliveroo workers protested about working conditions in Berlin, Germany. In January 2018, Deliveroo riders went on strike in Belgium and the Netherlands.

In March 2021, local press reported on complaints that Deliveroo riders in Manchester were spotted "allegedly using bushes as ‘public toilets’ while waiting to collect orders."

In April 2021, on the company's trading debut on the London Stock Exchange, a group of Deliveroo's riders in London held a strike protesting about pay and work conditions.

In June 2021, Deliveroo won a court case against the IWGB, which concerned the company's classification of its couriers. While the IWGB argued that Deliveroo couriers should be considered employees and have the right to unionise, Deliveroo classified them as self-employed. The court upheld Deliveroo's definition. 

In April 2022, Deliveroo was fined a maximum penalty of 375,000 euros for abusing the freelance status of its riders in France. The company was obliged to publish the court decision on its French home page for a month.

Noise  

In its two largest markets, the United Kingdom and France, operations in and around a number of Deliveroo's Editions sites have attracted complaints from neighbouring residents.

In the London suburb of Islington, the local Deliveroo Editions site was the subject of complaints from neighbours, as a result of noise from air conditioning fans at the site as well as from the stream of delivery mopeds circling the site. In response to the complaints, in 2021 the local council issued an enforcement notice to shut down the operation. Deliveroo has appealed against the notice.

In 2020, a Deliveroo editions site in the northern Paris suburb of Saint-Ouen was the subject of similar complaints. The site, one of the first in France, was located directly opposite an apartment block, and the noise from delivery scooters arriving and departing from the site resulted in multiple complaints from the residents.

Following on from a meeting with the local elected representative and those of the company, Deliveroo agreed to restrict entry to the site to delivery riders on electric scooters and bicycles, with parking spots allocated for riders on petrol scooters further down the road. Following this controversy, Deliveroo installed recharge terminals at all of their French Editions sites.

Safety 
The company has been criticised for its failure to provide cycle training and safety equipment (such as lights and helmets) to its sometimes inexperienced riders. It has been argued that the need to race against the clock is another reason for couriers' potentially risky cycling behaviour, and that bikes should be checked for safety.

Partnerships and charity 
In July 2020, Deliveroo partnered with the NSPCC to train couriers to spot and report signs of child abuse. More than 7,000 riders completed the training.

In May 2021, Deliveroo announced a partnership with some grocery partners to distribute one million meals to those in need in the UK. The campaign was fronted by television and radio presenter Maya Jama.

In June 2021, Deliveroo announced a partnership with Neighbourhood Watch (United Kingdom) giving couriers the option to train to help spot the signs of crimes ranging from sexual harassment to domestic abuse and drug dealing.

References

Bibliography
E McGaughey, 'Uber, the Taylor Review, and the duty to not misrepresent employment status' (2018) Industrial Law Journal
E McGaughey, 'Taylorooism: When Network Technology Meets Corporate Power' (2018) Industrial Relations Journal

External links

 Deliveroo Holdings plc

Online retailers of the United Kingdom
Companies listed on the London Stock Exchange
British companies established in 2013
Retail companies established in 2013
Transport companies established in 2013
Internet properties established in 2013
Online food ordering
Companies based in the City of Westminster
2013 establishments in England
Australian-themed retailers
2021 initial public offerings